Sirona Dental Systems Inc. (Sirona) was a global dental equipment manufacturer, and the world's largest dental equipment provider, which used to be part of Siemens. On 15 September 2015, it was acquired by Dentsply and renamed to Dentsply Sirona.

It became an independent company in 1997. The company is headquartered in Long Island City, New York. So far, it has facilities in over 17 countries and serves over 100 countries and districts. In 2011, the company was ranked at 27th in the list of America's Best Small Companies by Forbes. The company built the world's first dental X-ray unit, REKORD. In 2013, the company was awarded the Top Employer Award for Germany, Austria and Engineer in 2013. Its subsidiary in China, Sirona China, was given Top Employer China 2014. In 2014, it won the Good Design Award (Chicago) 2013 for its excellence design of two products.

Background
The company was originated from Erwin Moritz Reiniger, a mechanical engineer at the University of Erlangen. In 1880s, with his technologies, he invited two business partners to set up a company producing electric-powered dental drill. The company built the world’s first dental X-ray unit in 1905 and was acquired by Siemens & Halske in 1925. After that, the company has been engaged in developing and manufacturing a variety of dental equipment.

In 1997, Sirona became an independent company when Siemens sold its dental subsidy to Schroder Ventures, and acquired several industrial companies to enlarge its business in subsequent years. In 2003, the Swedish private equity firm EQT Partners acquired Sirona, only to sell this company to Madison Dearborn Partners two years later. Under their ownership, Sirona merged with Schick Technologies Inc., an American producer of X-ray devices, through a reverse takeover, resulting in a NASDAQ listing for Sirona in 2006.

On 15 September 2015, Dentsply agreed to acquire Sirona Dental Systems Inc. for $5.5 billion in stock, renaming itself to Dentsply Sirona in the process.

Sirona operates its business through four segments including Dental CAD/CAM Systems, Imaging Systems, Treatment Centers and Instruments. Dental CAD/CAM is engaged in developing and providing material and equipment for dental restoration. Imaging Systems offers 2D and 3D imaging systems for dental diagnostics. Treatment Centers designs and produces dental basic infrastructure for medical centers. Additionally, Instruments segment manufactures a variety of dental treatment instrument. Its customer base consists of dental practices, clinics and laboratories and the company distributes its products through over 450 facilities in the world.

References

External links
Official Website
Dental Implant

Manufacturing companies established in 1997
Health care companies established in 1997
Dental companies of the United States
Companies formerly listed on the Nasdaq
Health care companies based in New York (state)
Medical technology companies of the United States
2015 mergers and acquisitions